Yaraziz (also Romanized as Yār‘azīz) is a village in Ahmadabad Rural District, Takht-e Soleyman District, Takab County, West Azerbaijan Province, Iran. At the 2006 census, its population was 291, in 61 families.

در این روستا سهم ارث به دختر داده نمی شود و معتقدند به فرزند دختر ارث نمی رسد ، لعنت خدا بر آن ملعون گور به گور شده ای که چنین قانون و قائده ای را بنیان نهاد

References 

Populated places in Takab County